Lucius Cornelius Merula may refer to

Lucius Cornelius Merula (consul 193 BC), politician and general of the 2nd century BC
Lucius Cornelius Merula (consul 87 BC), politician of the 1st century BC